First Old School Baptist Church of Roxbury and Vega Cemetery is a historic Baptist church and cemetery located at Roxbury in Delaware County, New York. The church was built in 1856 in a Greek Revival style and is a rectangular, front gabled frame building in the meeting house form. It was added to the National Register of Historic Places in 1996.

This building is currently a venue of the Roxbury Arts Group and is used seasonally for acoustic performances. The Roxbury Arts Group is located in the hamlet of Roxbury on 5025 Vega Mountain Road. To find out more about the Old School Baptist Church and the Roxbury Arts Group visit https://roxburyartsgroup.org/.

See also
National Register of Historic Places listings in Delaware County, New York

References

Baptist churches in New York (state)
Churches on the National Register of Historic Places in New York (state)
Cemeteries on the National Register of Historic Places in New York (state)
National Register of Historic Places in Delaware County, New York
Churches completed in 1856
19th-century Baptist churches in the United States
Churches in Delaware County, New York
Cemeteries in Delaware County, New York
Baptist cemeteries in the United States
Historic districts on the National Register of Historic Places in New York (state)